Mohammed Aqeel (alias Dr. Usman) (d. December 19, 2014, by hanging) was a Pakistani militant and member of the banned terrorist organization Lashkar-e-Jhangvi and former soldier in Pakistan Army Medical Corps where he worked until 2006. Originally from Kahuta Tehsil in Punjab.

Aqeel was suspected of involvement in the February 2008 assassination of Lieutenant General Mushtaq Ahmed Baig, the Surgeon General of the Army Medical Corps. Dr. Usman was also arrested in connection with the Islamabad Marriott Hotel bombing in September 2008.

Aqeel is the suspected mastermind of March 3, 2009 attack on the Sri Lanka national cricket team. On March 9, 2009 he escaped when police raided his hideout early in the morning.  He has also been suspected of an attack on retired General Pervez Musharraf.  He was said to have fled to the Federally Administered Tribal Areas several days prior to the raid.

Months later Aqeel took part in the attack on the Pakistan Army General Headquarters in Rawalpindi. He was captured in October 2009 while holding hostages and trying to blow himself up; Aqeel was injured in the process.

In 2011, Aqeel was sentenced to death by a military court. During the government of Asif Ali Zardari, he filled a mercy plea but it was rejected.

After 2014 Peshawar school attack, moratorium on the capital punishment was lifted in terror-related cases by Nawaz Sharif after which Aqeel along with Arshad Mehmood, the convicted for an assassination attempt on General Pervez Musharraf was accused to be executed. In the evening of December 19, Aqeel and Arshad were hanged till death.

References

Sunni Islamists
Year of birth missing
People executed by Pakistan by hanging
Pakistani criminals
Pakistani military doctors
People from Rawalpindi District
Punjabi people
Terrorism in Pakistan
2014 deaths